Reierson is a surname. Notable people with the surname include:

Dave Reierson (born 1964), Canadian ice hockey player
Raymond Reierson (1919–2020), Canadian politician
William Reierson Arbuthnot (1826–1913), British businessman and legislator